Aksenovsky Pochinok is a rural locality (a village) in Ust-Alexeyevskoye Rural Settlement, Velikoustyugsky District, Vologda Oblast, Russia. The population was 15 as of 2002.

Geography 
Aksenovsky Pochinok is located 57 km southeast of Veliky Ustyug (the district's administrative centre) by road. Ust-Alexeyevo is the nearest rural locality.

References 

Rural localities in Velikoustyugsky District